Drope is a hamlet.

Drope may also refer to:

Earle Drope (1898–1969), Canadian Politician
 Francis Drope (1629–1671), English arboriculturist
Thomas Drope
 Drope v. Missouri, a 1975 US Supreme Court case